Grass Geysers...Carbon Clouds is the fourth full-length studio album from indie rock band Enon, released in 2007 via Touch and Go Records.

Track listing

 "Mirror On You"
 "Colette"
 "Dr. Freeze"
 "Sabina"
 "Piece of Mind"
 "Law of Johnny Dolittle"
 "Those Who Don't Blink"
 "Pigeneration"
 "Mr. Ratatatatat"
 "Paperweights"
  "Labyrinth"
 "Ashish"

References

External links
Enon Official Site

2007 albums
Touch and Go Records albums
Enon (band) albums